Rudbar Rural District is a rural district (dehestan) in the Central District of Damghan County, Semnan Province, Iran. At the 2006 census, its population was 4,536, in 1,215 families.  The rural district has 21 villages.

References 

Rural Districts of Semnan Province
Damghan County